Brenda Vineyard Runyon (1868–1929), founder and director of the First Woman's Bank of Tennessee in Clarksville, Tennessee in 1919. The bank was the first bank in the United States to be managed and directed entirely by women. Ms Runyon resigned her position in 1926 due to failing health and was unable to secure a successor. The First Trust and Savings Bank of Clarksville absorbed the bank in 1926.

Ms. Runyon was the wife of a Clarksville physician Dr. Frank Runyon. Both doctor and Ms Runyon were born in Trenton, Todd County, Kentucky. They had two sons, both pursued professional careers. Ms. Runyon was active in the civic affairs of Clarksville and was director of the Clarksville branch of the American Red Cross during World War I. It was following the war that Ms Runyon organized the First Woman's Bank of Tennessee after being challenged to do so by a local business.

References
 The Tennessee Encyclopedia of History and Culture, EntryID F017
 Clarksville-Montgomery County Website, About Clarksville

1868 births
1929 deaths
American bankers
American women bankers